Girik Khosla (born 4 January 1995) is an Indian professional footballer who plays as an attacking midfielder for I-League club Real Kashmir.

Career
Born in Mumbai, Girik Khosla started his footballing journey with the youth setup of Mumbai FC where he captained the U14 and U17 teams before moving to the state team of Chandigarh. He caught the eyes of Minerva Punjab after guiding his state team Chandigarh to qualify for the final stages of the Santosh Trophy. 

He made his senior debut for Minerva Punjab in the 2016-17 I-League season against DSK Shivajians as he came on as a substitute. He was part of the 2017-18 I-League winning team where he made 12 appearances and scored one goal.

His performance caught the eyes of Indian Super League side NorthEast United FC and he joined them for the 2018–19 Indian Super League season, however he made just one appearance for the Highlanders and failed to get any gametime.

Girik Khosla returned to Minerva Punjab in the 2016-17 I-League season and got some gametime, as he scored two goals in seven appearances.

Career statistics

Club

Honours

Club
Minerva Punjab
I-League: 2017–18

References

External links 
 Profile

1995 births
Living people
Indian footballers
RoundGlass Punjab FC players
East Bengal Club players
Footballers from Mumbai
I-League players
Association football midfielders
NorthEast United FC players
Indian Super League players
Sreenidi Deccan FC players
Real Kashmir FC players